The Libyan Super Cup is a Libyan football championship contested between the winners of the Libyan Premier League and the Alfatih Cup. The game is played at the beginning of the following season, and signals the beginning of the domestic year. The Super Cup was a two-legged final in 1997 but became one-legged from 1998 onwards. Al Ittihad are the most successful club with ten titles in total, including nine consecutive titles from 2002 onwards.

Winners 
1997 (two-legged) : Tahaddy 1–0, 0–0 Nasr
1998 : Mahalla 3–1 Shat
1999 : Ittihad 0–0 (11–10 penalty) Mahalla
2000 : Ahly Tripoli 2–0 Sweahly 
2001 : Madina 2–1 Ahly Tripoli
2002 : Ittihad 1–0 Hilal
2003 : Ittihad 3–0 Nasr
2004 : Ittihad 5–2 Olomby
2005 : Ittihad 1–0 Akhdar
2006 : Ittihad 1–0 Ahly Tripoli
2007 : Ittihad 3–1 (aet) Akhdar 
2008 : Ittihad 4–0 Khaleej Sirte
2009 : Ittihad 3–2 Tersanah
2010 : Ittihad 3–0 Nasr
2011–2016: no competition
2017 : Ahly Tripoli 3–0 (awd.) Hilal

External links
RSSSF competition history

 
Libya